The following lists events that happened during 1998 in Angola.

Incumbents
 President: José Eduardo dos Santos 
 Prime Minister: Dr. Fernando José de França Dias Van-Dúnem
 President of the National Assembly: Roberto Victor de Almeida

Events

August
 August 29 - The rebels are reported to have evacuated the port city of Matadi, Democratic Republic of the Congo. Angolan troops are reported to have arrived supporting Kabila without fighting in the city.
 August 31 - Angola admits to sending troops to DRC.

September
 September 3 - South Africa now says it supports the intervention of the Democratic Republic of the Congo by Namibia, Zimbabwe and Angola, supporting Kabila.

December
 December 5 - The rebel leader said that Angolan and Zimbabwean troops have launched a counter-offensive against his troops in the northwest of the Democratic Republic of the Congo.

References

 
Years of the 20th century in Angola
1990s in Angola
Angola
Angola